The men's 100 metres T12 event at the 2020 Summer Paralympics in Tokyo, took place between 27 and 29 August 2021.

Records
Prior to the competition, the existing records were as follows:

Results

Heats
Heat 1 took place on 27 August 2021, at 10:14:

Heat 2 took place on 27 August 2021, at 10:21:

Heat 3 took place on 27 August 2021, at 10:28:

Final
The final took place on 29 August 2021, at 21:04:

References

Men's 100 metres T12
2021 in men's athletics